Evandar may refer to:

Fictional Characters
 King Evandar, a character in the Inheritance Cycle book series
 Evandar, a character in the Deverry Cycle book series